Shivendra Raje Bhosale is an Indian politician and a member of Bharatiya Janata Party. He is a descendant of Chatrapati Shivaji, founder of the Maratha Empire. He is heir to the Satara royal family.

He was elected to Maharashtra Legislative Assembly from Satara constituency from 2004 to 2019 as a member of the Nationalist Congress Party. He joined Bharatiya Janata Party ahead of 2019 Maharashtra Legislative Assembly election.
Ssc passed from Annasaheb Kalyani Vidyalaya Satara.

Personal life

He is son of Abhaysinh Raje Bhosale who was also MLA in the Maharashtra Legislative Assembly from Satara constituency. Udayanraje Bhosale is his cousin.

References

Living people
People from Satara (city)
Marathi politicians
Maharashtra MLAs 2014–2019
Nationalist Congress Party politicians from Maharashtra
Bharatiya Janata Party politicians from Maharashtra
Year of birth missing (living people)